Seul... avec vous is the name of the first live album recorded by the Canadian singer Garou. Recorded during Garou's 2001 concerts tour and released on 6 November 2001, this album contains many songs from his debut album, Seul, and other songs from the musical Notre-Dame de Paris, plus a cover version of "Le Monde est stone" in a studio version (this song was originally recorded for the French musical Starmania in 1977), which was the only single from this live album. Seul... avec vous met success in the Belgium and France, reaching the top five of the charts.

Track listing
 "Je n'attendais que vous" — 5:32
 "Gitan" — 4:54
 "Que l'amour est violent" — 6:08
 "La Bohême" — 4:42
 "Au plaisir de ton corps" — 4:34
 "Ce soir on danse à Naziland" — 3:53
 "Demande au soleil" — 5:33
 "Belle" — 4:55
 "Au Bout de mes rêves" — 4:03
 "You Can Leave Your Hat On" — 4:08
 "Medley R&B" — 8:59
 "Sex Machine"
 "Everybody"
 "Shout"
 "I Feel Good"
 "Dieu que le monde est injuste" — 3:49
 "Seul" — 5:47
 "Le Monde est stone" (Studio Version) — 4:01

Credits
 Recorded by Denis Savage and Éric Massicotte, with Piccolo Mobile Studio
 Mixed at Piccolo Studio (Montreal) by Denis Savage with Brian Mercier
 Mastering: Vlado Meller
 Conductor and guitarist: Éric Rock
 Choristers: Élise Duguay, Julie Leblanc, Francesco Verrecchia
 Keyboards: Michel Ferrari
 Drums kit: Sébastien Langlois
 Bass: Grégoire Morency
 Saxo: Dany Roy
 Trumpet: Roger Walls
 Guitars: Francesco Verrecchia
 Sound: Denis Ayotte, François Desjardins, Francis Gaudreau, Carl Gaudreau, Éric Massicotte
 Executive producer: Vito Luprano

Certifications

Charts

Weekly charts

Year-end charts

References

Garou (singer) albums
2001 live albums
Sony Music Canada live albums